Terry Marks is a Stuckist artist in New York City. She was one of the US artists in the show The Stuckists Punk Victorian at the Walker Art Gallery during the 2004 Liverpool Biennial. She is also a tattooist and actor for film and television. Terry is a member of the Screen Actors Guild and the American Federation of Television and Radio Artists.

Life and art

Terry Marks was born and raised in New York City. As a young teenager she met painter Joseph Wolins, known for his work during the WPA period, who became her first art teacher and mentor.

In 1980, she moved to London, England, where she lived for nine years, went to art college and worked in a lot of hellish pubs pulling pints for football hooligans. Marks received a BA Hons in Fine Art Printmaking  from the Central Saint Martins College of Art and Design (1987) and an MFA in painting at New York Academy of Art (1993). After a chance hearing of a radio piece on Stuckism in 2001, she became founder of New York Stuckism, a local chapter of the international ReModernist art group. In addition to exhibiting with the Stuckists in England, she has also shown her work with the Melbourne Stuckists in Australia.

Other notable shows include her solo exhibition "This is Not an installation" (2004) at the Koi Gallery in Brooklyn, New York, and participation in the 1st Stuckist International (2002), Stuckist Centre, London. Marks has been exhibiting her work since 1982 and has taken part in many exhibitions in the United Kingdom, US, and Australia. Her work is in numerous private collections in the US & UK.

In a 2004 interview for NY Arts Magazine, she made the following statement about Stuckism that has been often quoted:

On her process, she has said,

Selected awards
 1990 Dori Brown Award, Northern Arts Council (US).
 1988 CCA Galleries Award for Print, Christies Contemporary Arts, London.
 1987 Whitworth Young Contemporaries, Manchester England Whatman Paper Award,
 Young Printmakers Editions, Royal Academy of Art, London, UK.
 Whatman Paper Award, British Printmakers Council, UK.

Gallery

See also
Remodernism
Stuckism
Stuckism in America
The Stuckists Punk Victorian

References

 Strickland, Carol (2004) NY Arts Magazine, Stuckist in New York City: An Interview with Narrative Painter Terry Marks
 Milner, Frank ed. (2004), "The Stuckists Punk Victorian" National Museums Liverpool,

External links
 Terry Marks official website
 Terry Marks on the Walker Art Gallery website
 Painting is Back
 Stuckist in New York, interview with narrative painter, Terry Marks with Carol Strickland, May 2004

Living people
20th-century American painters
American women painters
21st-century American painters
Stuckism
1960 births
20th-century American women artists
21st-century American women artists